Krusty may refer to: 

Krusty (music group), a female Hong Kong music group formed in 2005
Krusty  the Clown, a fictional character in the cartoon The Simpsons
Krusty Krab, a fictional restaurant in the cartoon SpongeBob SquarePants
KRUSTY, NASA project aiming to develop nuclear reactors for space travel

See also
Crusty punk, a form of music influenced by English punk rock and extreme metal
CRUSY, a USY region consisting of Ohio, Kentucky, Michigan, Indiana, Western Pennsylvania and West Virginia